Souleymane Traore (July 10, 1987 – October 21, 2009) was a Guinean footballer who played for Arema Malang in the 2008-09 Indonesia Super League.

Career

Mali
He played several years in the football competition in Mali (Malien Premiere Division) before he moved to Indonesia to play football with PSS Sleman.

Indonesia
He began his career in Indonesia in 2007 with the club PSS Sleman. In the 2008–2009 season he joined the team of Arema Malang by contributing 5 goals from 20 games.

He ended his contract with Arema on the basis of his health before he died.

Personal life
Traore was born in Guinea.

After two months of illness, he died on October 21, 2009 at the house in Bintaro, South Jakarta of his friend Alseny Diawara (ex-Persema Malang).

References

External links

1987 births
2009 deaths
Guinean footballers
Arema F.C. players
Association football midfielders
Expatriate footballers in Indonesia
Guinean expatriate footballers
Liga 1 (Indonesia) players
Guinean expatriate sportspeople in Indonesia